Dmytro Skoblov (born 30 November 1989) is a Ukrainian football striker who plays for Mazovia Mińsk Mazowiecki in Poland.

Career
He made his debut for main Illichivets time as substitution in second half in match against FC Krymteplytsia Molodizhne in Ukrainian First League on 3 August 2007.

References

External links 

Ukrainian footballers
Ukrainian expatriate footballers
FC Mariupol players
FC Illichivets-2 Mariupol players
FC Shakhtar-3 Donetsk players
FC Feniks-Illichovets Kalinine players
FC Bukovyna Chernivtsi players
FC Helios Kharkiv players
Ukrainian Premier League players
Association football midfielders
1989 births
Living people
FC Volyn Lutsk players
FC Kramatorsk players
FC Kremin Kremenchuk players
FC Metalurh Zaporizhzhia players
Ukrainian First League players
Ukrainian expatriate sportspeople in Poland
Expatriate footballers in Poland
Sportspeople from Mariupol